Oysters at Nam Kee's is a 2002 Dutch drama film, directed by Pollo de Pimentel, starring Katja Schuurman and Egbert Jan Weeber.

The film received a Golden Film (75,000 visitors) in 2002.

Plot
Berry (Egbert Jan Weeber) is a boy who plays fast and loose and likes to hang around with his friends. One day he meets Thera (Katja Schuurman), a girl who's a little bit older, and she turns his head around. They start a romance culminating in a meetup at Nam Kee, a Chinese restaurant in Amsterdam where they have oysters for dinner. Suddenly Thera disappears and Berry becomes crazy of the silence and his unrequited love.

Main cast
 Katja Schuurman as Thera
 Egbert Jan Weeber as Berry Kooijman
 Johnny de Mol as Otto
 Edwin Jonker as Felicio
 Mohammed Chaara as Jamal
 Hans Dagelet as Mr. Kooijman, Berry's father
 Guusje Eijbers as Mrs. Kooijman, Berry's mother
 Cees Geel as Barber
 Touriya Haoud as Moroccan girl

External links

2002 films
2002 romantic drama films
Films set in the Netherlands
Dutch romantic drama films
2000s Dutch-language films